Elmer Edward Klumpp (August 26, 1906 – October 18, 1996) was a catcher in Major League Baseball. He played for the Washington Senators in 1934 and the Brooklyn Dodgers in 1937.

External links

1906 births
1996 deaths
Major League Baseball catchers
Brooklyn Dodgers players
Washington Senators (1901–1960) players
Baseball players from St. Louis
Ottumwa Packers players
Burlington Bees players
Terre Haute Tots players
Milwaukee Brewers (minor league) players
Cedar Rapids Bunnies players
Quincy Indians players
Springfield Senators players
Birmingham Barons players
Chattanooga Lookouts players
Little Rock Travelers players
Wilkes-Barre Barons (baseball) players
Albany Senators players
Scranton Miners players
Elmira Pioneers players
Jersey City Skeeters players
Portland Beavers players
Knoxville Smokies players
New Orleans Pelicans (baseball) players
Nashville Vols players
People from Menomonee Falls, Wisconsin